Pohlia cruda is a species of moss belonging to the family Bryaceae.

It has cosmopolitan distribution.

References

Mniaceae